Nenad Miloš (born 13 May 1955 Zadar, Croatia) is a Serbia i Croatian former swimmer who competed in the 1972 Summer Olympics,  in the 1976 Summer Olympics, and in the 1980 Summer Olympics.

His twin brother Predrag Miloš is also a retired swimmer with little success unfortunately.

References

1955 births
Living people
Serbian male swimmers
Male backstroke swimmers
Olympic swimmers of Yugoslavia
Swimmers at the 1972 Summer Olympics
Swimmers at the 1976 Summer Olympics
Swimmers at the 1980 Summer Olympics
Yugoslav male swimmers
Mediterranean Games gold medalists for Yugoslavia
Mediterranean Games bronze medalists for Yugoslavia
Swimmers at the 1971 Mediterranean Games
Swimmers at the 1975 Mediterranean Games
Mediterranean Games medalists in swimming